The Iceland women's national football team represents Iceland in international women's football. They are currently ranked as the 17th best women's national team in the world by FIFA as of December 2019. On 30 October 2008, the national team qualified to the 2009 UEFA Women's Championship, the first major football tournament Iceland ever took part in, having previously competed in the 1995 UEFA Women's Championship which was a home and away knockout competition. At the 2013 UEFA Women's Championship, they took their first point in a major championship, following a draw against Norway in the opening game.

During qualifiers for Women's Euro 2009 Þóra Tómasdóttir and Hrafnhildur Gunnarsdóttir followed the team and recorded the documentary Stelpurnar okkar (translated: Our Girls) which was premiered on 14 August 2009.

History
The Iceland women's national football team played its first game on 20 September 1981, facing Scotland. Bryndís Einarsdóttir scored Iceland's first ever goal in the 2–3 loss, with Ásta B. Gunnlaugsdóttir scoring the other.

Team image

Nicknames
The Iceland women's national football team has been known or nicknamed as the "Stelpurnar okkar (Our Girls)".

Home stadium
Iceland plays their home matches on the Laugardalsvöllur.

Results and fixtures

The following is a list of match results in the last 12 months, as well as any future matches that have been scheduled.

Legend

2022

2023

Coaching staff

Current coaching staff

Manager history

Source:

 after the match against .

Players

Current squad
The following 22 players have been called up for 2023 FIFA Women's World Cup qualifying matches against Belarus and the Netherlands on 2 and 6 September 2022

Caps and goals are current as of 23 August 2022.

Recent call-ups
The following players have been called up to a squad in the last 12 months.

 INJ 
  

 RET
 
 
 
 
 
 
 INJ 
   

 
 
 
 
 
 

 INJ
 INJ

Notes:
: Withdrew due to injury

Previous squads
UEFA Women's Championship
2009 UEFA Women's Championship
2013 UEFA Women's Championship
2017 UEFA Women's Championship

Captains

Katrín Jónsdóttir (2007–2013)
Margrét Lára Viðarsdóttir (2015–2017)
Sara Björk Gunnarsdóttir (2014, 2017–)

Records

Players in bold are still active, at least at club level.

Most capped players

Top goalscorers

Honours

Other tournaments
Algarve Cup
  Runners-up: 2011
  Third place: 2014, 2016
SheBelieves Cup
  Runners-up: 2022
Pinatar Cup
  Champions: 2023

Competitive record

FIFA Women's World Cup

*Draws include knockout matches decided on penalty kicks.

UEFA Women's Championship

*Draws include knockout matches decided on penalty kicks.

Algarve Cup
The Algarve Cup is an invitational tournament for national teams in women's association football hosted by the Portuguese Football Federation (FPF). Held annually in the Algarve region of Portugal since 1994, it is one of the most prestigious and longest-running women's international football events and has been nicknamed the "Mini FIFA Women's World Cup".

Other tournaments

See also

Sport in Iceland
Football in Iceland
Women's football in Iceland
Iceland men's national football team

References

External links
Official website
FIFA profile

 
national
European women's national association football teams